Pseudargyrotoza conwagana is a moth of the family Tortricidae found in Asia and Europe. It was first described by the Danish entomologists, Johan Christian Fabricius in 1775.

Description
The wingspan is 11–15 mm. The thorax is crested. The forewings are triangular, yellow, more or less suffused with orange or ferruginous and faintly darker-strigulated. The basal patch is often darker and always followed by a pale yellow dorsal mark. The central and terminal fasciae are often darker or blackish-mixed, edged with leaden-metallic dots. The hindwings are blackish - grey, lighter anteriorly. The larva yellow-whitish; dorsal line darker; head yellow-brownish.

Adults are on wing from May to July.

The larvae feed on ash (Fraxinus excelsior), Manchurian ash (Fraxinus mandshurica), privet (Ligustrum species) (including  broad-leaf privet (Ligustrum lucidum)) and barberry (Berberis species).

Distribution
It is found in Europe, China (Heilongjiang, Jilin, Shaanxi, Sichuan, Beijing, Shandong), South Korea, Japan, Russia (Siberia, Ussuri) and Asia Minor.

References

External links
 waarneming.nl 
 Lepidoptera of Belgium

Cnephasiini
Moths described in 1775
Moths of Asia
Tortricidae of Europe
Taxa named by Johan Christian Fabricius